State Route 92 (SR 92) is a state highway in the U.S. state of California, serving as a major east-west corridor in the San Francisco Bay Area. From its west end at State Route 1 in Half Moon Bay near the coast, it heads east across the San Francisco Peninsula and the San Mateo–Hayward Bridge to downtown Hayward in the East Bay at its junction with State Route 238 and State Route 185. It has interchanges with three freeways: Interstate 280 (the Junipero Serra Freeway), U.S. Route 101 (the Bayshore Freeway) in or near San Mateo, and Interstate 880 (the Nimitz Freeway) in Hayward.  It also connects indirectly to Interstates 238 and 580 by way of Hayward's Foothill Boulevard, which carries Route 238 and flows directly into Route 92.

Route description

Between Half Moon Bay and Interstate 280, Route 92 winds through the Coast Range as a narrow, mainly undivided two and three lane highway with a switchback turn. The east-bound uphill portion was upgraded with a long passing lane.  Between Interstate 280 and Interstate 880 it is entirely a divided multilane highway, including the toll San Mateo-Hayward Bridge, the longest span across the San Francisco Bay.  East of Interstate 880 the route becomes a divided surface street in Hayward, locally known as Jackson Street.

State Route 92 traverses through significant habitat areas including wetland, California oak woodland, chaparral and grassland.  In one serpentine soil location near Crystal Springs Reservoir, it passes near one of the only known colonies of the endangered wildflower Pentachaeta bellidiflora and near one of the limited number of colonies of the endangered Eriophyllum latilobum.

SR 92 is part of the California Freeway and Expressway System, and a small portion near SR 1 as well as the entire portion east of I-280 are part of the National Highway System, a network of highways that are considered essential to the country's economy, defense, and mobility by the Federal Highway Administration. SR 92 is eligible for the State Scenic Highway System, but it is not officially designated as a scenic highway by the California Department of Transportation.

History
The San Mateo section was once referred to as the 19th Avenue Freeway which was the street name where the freeway now exits.  Parts of the street remain. This section is also known as the J. Arthur Younger Freeway; J. Arthur Younger was a United States representative who served during the 1950s and 60s. 

An upgrade of the intersection with Main Street in Half Moon Bay is in the late planning stage. The old cloverleaf interchange with Interstate 880 was converted into a three-level combination interchange with direct ramp replacements for two of the tight "cloverleaf" ramps, and a new wider and taller overpass to carry Route 92 over Interstate 880. The project took four years and was completed in October 2011. A similar cloverleaf interchange at SR 82 was rebuilt in 2018 into a partial cloverleaf interchange.

Major intersections

See also

References

External links

Bay Area FasTrak – includes toll information on the San Mateo–Hayward Bridge and the other Bay Area toll facilities
Caltrans: Road Information
California @ AARoads.com - State Route 92
California Highways: SR 92

092
092
State Route 092
State Route 092
Transportation in Hayward, California